
Gmina Tomaszów Mazowiecki is a rural gmina (administrative district) in Tomaszów Mazowiecki County, Łódź Voivodeship, in central Poland. Its seat is the town of Tomaszów Mazowiecki, although the town is not part of the territory of the gmina.

The gmina contains part of the protected areas of Spała Landscape Park and Sulejów Landscape Park.

Villages
Gmina Tomaszów Mazowiecki contains the villages and settlements of Cekanów, Chorzęcin, Ciebłowice Duże, Ciebłowice Małe, Dąbrowa, Godaszewice, Jadwigów, Jeleń, Karolinów, Komorów, Kwiatkówka, Łazisko, Niebrów, Sługocice, Smardzewice, Świńsko, Swolszewice Małe, Tresta Rządowa, Twarda, Wąwał, Wiaderno, Zaborów Drugi, Zaborów Pierwszy, Zawada and Zawada-Kolonia.

Neighbouring gminas
Gmina Tomaszów Mazowiecki is bordered by the town of Tomaszów Mazowiecki and by the gminas of Inowłódz, Lubochnia, Mniszków, Sławno, Ujazd and Wolbórz.

References
Polish official population figures 2006

Tomaszow Mazowiecki
Tomaszów Mazowiecki County